Osleidys Menéndez Sáez (born November 14, 1979) is a retired Cuban track and field athlete who competed in the javelin throw. She was a World and Olympic Champion, and held the world record from 2001 to 2008. Her personal best of 71.70 m remains the North, Central American and Caribbean record and ranks her third on the overall list.

When winning the 2005 World Athletics Championships, Menéndez broke her own world record with a throw of 71.70 m. This record was broken by Olympic champion Barbora Špotáková in September 2008 with a throw of 72.28 m.

She won the Cuban National Games in 2004.

Personal bests
Javelin throw: 71.70 m –  Helsinki, 14 August 2005

International competitions

References

External links

Tilastopaja biography
Ecured biography (in Spanish)
 Picture of Osleidys Menéndez

1979 births
Living people
People from Matanzas Province
Cuban female javelin throwers
Olympic athletes of Cuba
Olympic gold medalists for Cuba
Olympic bronze medalists for Cuba
Olympic gold medalists in athletics (track and field)
Olympic bronze medalists in athletics (track and field)
Athletes (track and field) at the 2000 Summer Olympics
Athletes (track and field) at the 2004 Summer Olympics
Athletes (track and field) at the 2008 Summer Olympics
Medalists at the 2000 Summer Olympics
Medalists at the 2004 Summer Olympics
Pan American Games gold medalists for Cuba
Pan American Games bronze medalists for Cuba
Pan American Games medalists in athletics (track and field)
Athletes (track and field) at the 1999 Pan American Games
Athletes (track and field) at the 2003 Pan American Games
Athletes (track and field) at the 2007 Pan American Games
Universiade medalists in athletics (track and field)
Goodwill Games medalists in athletics
World Athletics Championships athletes for Cuba
World Athletics Championships medalists
World record setters in athletics (track and field)
Central American and Caribbean Games silver medalists for Cuba
Competitors at the 1998 Central American and Caribbean Games
Competitors at the 2006 Central American and Caribbean Games
Universiade gold medalists for Cuba
World Athletics Championships winners
Central American and Caribbean Games medalists in athletics
Medalists at the 2001 Summer Universiade
Competitors at the 2001 Goodwill Games
Medalists at the 1999 Pan American Games
Medalists at the 2003 Pan American Games
Medalists at the 2007 Pan American Games
Goodwill Games gold medalists in athletics
21st-century Cuban women
20th-century Cuban women